Rentmeester is a surname. Notable people with the surname include:

 Bill Rentmeester (born 1986), American football fullback
 Co Rentmeester (Jakobus Willem Rentmeester; born 1936), Dutch rower and photojournalist